WNFA (88.3 FM) is a Christian teaching/worship radio station in Port Huron, Michigan, United States, branded as "Bluewater Christian Hit Radio". WNFA broadcasts with 1,300 watts.

WNFA formerly featured programming from the WAY-FM Network (formerly the Christian Hit Radio Satellite Network) until national distribution of WAY-FM programming (except for "The Wally Show" mornings) to non-owned stations ceased on July 1, 2013.  After a weekend of stunting with construction sounds, a revamped Power 88.3 debuted with a new local lineup.  The Wally Show continues to air in morning drive.

WNFA is also the former flagship station of the Christian teaching and inspirational music format "Wonderful News Radio," which now airs solely on sister station WNFR 90.7 FM.

On June 22, 2022, at 9 a.m., WNFA changed their format from contemporary Christian to Christian teaching and worship, branded as "Thrive Radio".

Previous logo

References
Michiguide.com - WNFA History

External links

Port Huron, Michigan
St. Clair County, Michigan
Radio stations established in 1986
1986 establishments in Michigan
NFA